The Men's China Squash Open 2019 was the men's edition of the 2019 China Squash Open, which is a tournament of the PSA World Tour World Tour Gold event (Prize money : 112 000 $). The event took place in Shanghai in China from 4 September to 8 September. Mohamed El Shorbagy won his second China Squash Open trophy, beating Ali Farag in the final.

Prize money and ranking points
For 2016, the prize purse was $112,000. The prize money and points breakdown is as follows:

Seeds

Draw and results

See also
2019–20 PSA World Tour
China Squash Open

References

External links
PSA China Squash Open 2019 website

Squash tournaments in China
China Squash Open
Squash Open
Men's Squash Open